George Dewey Hay (November 9, 1895 – May 8, 1968) was an American radio personality, announcer and newspaper reporter. He was the founder of the original Grand Ole Opry radio program on WSM-AM in Nashville, Tennessee, from which the country music stage show of the same name evolved.

Early newspaper and radio career
Hay was born in Attica, Indiana, United States. In Memphis, Tennessee, after World War I, he was a reporter for the Commercial Appeal. While on a reporting assignment in Mammoth Spring, Arkansas in 1919, Hay was invited to a hoedown in a local cabin.  There, a fiddle player, a guitar player, and a banjo player performed until dawn.  Hay was impressed, and that planted the seed for his later efforts.  When the newspaper launched its own radio station, WMC, in January 1923, he became a late-night announcer at the station. His popularity increased and in May 1924 he left for WLS in Chicago, where he served as the announcer on a program that became National Barn Dance.

Founding The Grand Ole Opry
On November 9, 1925, Hay's 30th birthday, he moved on to WSM in Nashville. Getting a strong listener reaction to 78-year-old fiddler Uncle Jimmy Thompson that November, Hay announced the following month that WSM would feature "an hour or two" of old-time music every Saturday night. He promoted the music and formed a booking agency.

The show was originally named WSM Barn Dance, and Hay billed himself as "The Solemn Old Judge."  The Barn Dance was broadcast after NBC's Music Appreciation Hour, a program featuring classical music and grand opera. One day in December 1927, the final music piece on the Music Appreciation Hour depicted the sound of a rushing locomotive. After the show ended, "Judge Hay" opened the WSM Barn Dance with this announcement:

Hay then introduced the man he dubbed "The Harmonica Wizard," DeFord Bailey, who played his classic train song, "The Pan American Blues," named for the crack Louisville and Nashville Railroad passenger train The Pan-American. After Bailey's performance, Hay commented, "For the past hour, we have been listening to music taken largely from Grand Opera. From now on we will present the Grand Ole Opry."

Newspaper, announcing, touring  and film appearance
During the 1930s, he was involved with Rural Radio, one of the first magazines about country music, developing the Opry for NBC and working on the movie Grand Ole Opry (1940). He was an announcer with the radio show during the 1940s and toured with Opry acts, including the September 1947 Opry show at Carnegie Hall. He was featured in Hoosier Holiday, a 1945 film from Republic Pictures, in a cast that also included Dale Evans.

Publication and legacy
In 1945, Hay wrote A Story of the Grand Ole Opry, and he became an editor of Nashville's Pickin’ and Singin’ News in 1953. He was inducted into the Country Music Hall of Fame in 1966.

Death
Hay moved to Virginia Beach, Virginia, where he died in 1968. He was interred at Forest Lawn Cemetery on 8100 Granby Street, Norfolk, Virginia 23505.

References

External links
Opry.com: Judge Hay and the Opry
Hay's bio at the Country Music Hall of Fame
Hay bio at Virtual Country Music Heritage Museum
George D. Hay at WLS-AM Chicago

American country singer-songwriters
American magazine editors
American writers about music
Radio personalities from Chicago
Country Music Hall of Fame inductees
Grand Ole Opry members
Radio personalities from Memphis, Tennessee
Radio personalities from Nashville, Tennessee
People from Virginia Beach, Virginia
Radio and television announcers
Tennessee culture
1895 births
1968 deaths
People from Attica, Indiana
Journalists from Mississippi
Singer-songwriters from Virginia
Journalists from Virginia
20th-century American singers
Country musicians from Tennessee
Country musicians from Illinois
Country musicians from Indiana
20th-century American journalists
American male journalists
Singer-songwriters from Indiana
Singer-songwriters from Tennessee
Singer-songwriters from Illinois